Guillermo Alejandro Tegue Caicedo (born 6 February 2000) is a Colombian footballer who currently plays as a defender for Independiente Medellín.

Career statistics

Club

Notes

References

2000 births
Living people
Colombian footballers
Colombia youth international footballers
Association football defenders
Independiente Medellín footballers
Categoría Primera A players
Sportspeople from Cauca Department